Dr. Lawrence Mulindwa is a Ugandan teacher, business man and entrepreneur who serves as the director and president of a football club Vipers SC. He is  the former president of the Uganda football governing board FUFA for nine straight years, and he was the second longest serving FUFA president after Kabaka Daudi Chwa in (1924-1932). He is also the executive director and former Head teacher of the school St. Mary's secondary school Kitende.
 
He was born in 1965 at Kanyike Kamengo, Mpigi and he is  Vipers SC's majority shareholder and a back bone of the four-time Uganda Premier League winners with 90% shares. He started his administration career as a Chairman of Bunamwaya FC now known as Vipers SC from 2000 to 2004.
Later on he left that position to Tadeus Kitandwe to contest for FUFA presidency which later achieved On 17 December 2005, after beating Chris Rwanika who was his immediate rival.

Achievements as FUFA president

He settled outstanding debts for the Federation which included recovery of the land title for the FUFA House in Mengo.
More capacity building courses were conducted during his time and Uganda Cranes was unbeaten at home for eight years. 
inter regions competitions were re-instated, FUFA awards were introduced, Uganda lifted the Cecafa Senior Challenge Cup for four times, and more sponsorship deals from many companies were signed; as well as enjoying relations with fans, Government, CAF and FIFA.

On Viper Sports Club

In 2013, he left FUFA, to put his attention on Vipers SC with an aim and a dream of making it the best Football Club in Uganda and on the African continent and this enabled the club to win four league titles, also triumphed in Uganda Cup, Fufa Super Cup and Fufa Super 8 Cup.

In March 2017, the football investor became the first Ugandan to own a private stadium called St. Mary's Stadium-Kitende. 
This was officially opened to the public with a CAF confederation cup game against Platinum Stars from South Africa which the Venoms beat 1–0. It was expanded to 600 more VIP seats totaling 1,500 VIP seats and 25,000 overall seats, making it the second largest stadium in Uganda.
In 2019, He unveiled a factory manufactured club bus the first to be in Uganda with a club name on the number plate, and opened a state of the art  gym at the stadium.

His school St. Mary's Kitende is also well known for grooming talents to the Senior team producing footballing stars like

 Jungu Methodius, 
 Bengo Steven, 
 Balinya Juma,
 Paul Mucureezi,
 Geoffrey Wasswa
 Lwaliwa Halid, 
 Anthony Bongole,
 Yuda Mugalu, 
 Alitho James,
 Ismail Watenga, 
 Murushid Juuko, 
 Dan Wagaluka, 
 Ibrahim Juma, 
 Kizito Luwagga,
 Muhammad Shaban 
 Kizito Keziron,
 Mike Mutyaba, 
 Deus Bukenya,
 Nicholas Wadada,
 Birikwalira Dan Danucho
 Siraje Sentamu, 
 Mandela Ashraf,
 Farouk Miya 
 Godfrey Walusimbi

On 13 December 2018, he was awarded an honorary doctorate degree from London graduate school in honour of his contributions towards development of education and sports which he received during the 15th Dubai leadership summit in UAE.

References

Living people
1965 births
People from Mpigi District
Ugandan chief executives
Vipers SC